El Haragán de la familia  (The Lazy One in the Family) is a 1940 Argentine comedy film directed by Luis Cesar Amadori.

Cast
 Pepe Arias
 Amelia Bence
 Ernesto Raquén
 Gloria Bayardo
 Mirtha Rey
 Alfredo Fornaserio
 Justo José Caraballo
 Angelina Pagano
 Juan José Piñeiro
 Elvira Quiroga
 José A. Paonessa
 Miguel Coiro

References

External links
 

1940 films
1940s Spanish-language films
Argentine black-and-white films
Films directed by Luis César Amadori
1940 comedy films
1940s Argentine films